The 2010 African Men's Handball Championship was the 19th edition of the African Men's Handball Championship, organized by the African Handball Confederation, which acted as the qualification process for the 2011 World Men's Handball Championship. It was held in Cairo and Suez Egypt between 10 and 21 February 2010.

Venues

Teams

Preliminary round 
All times are local (UTC+2).

Group A

Group B

Group C

Main round

Group D

Group E

Ranking round

Group F

Group G

Final round

Semifinals

Fifth place game

Third place game

Final

Final standings

Awards

See also 
2010 African Handball Champions League

References 

 Goalzz.com: Mens African Championship 19 Handball in Egypt

External links 
 todor66.com

African Men's Handball Championship
Men's Handball Championship
African men's championship
Sports competitions in Cairo
African handball championships
International handball competitions hosted by Egypt
February 2010 sports events in Africa